Saša Rakezić (born 1963 in Pančevo, Serbia), better known by his pen name Aleksandar Zograf, is a Serbian cartoonist. His works focus mostly on life in the former Yugoslavia, such as Life Under Sanctions, Psychonaut, Dream Watcher and Bulletins from Serbia.

Career 
Zograf's works started being published outside Serbia in the early 1990s, appearing first in American comics anthologies such as Weirdo and Zero Zero, and Seattle's Fantagraphics Books. British publisher Slab-O-Concrete also published a number of his books, and his works were translated and published in several European magazines. His solo titles have been issued by publishers L'Association in France, PuntoZero and Black Velvet in Italy, Jochen Enterprises in Germany, Službeni Glasnik and SKCNS in Serbia, VBZ in Croatia, KAPSIMI in Greece, Nyittott Kőnyv in Hungary, and Under Comics in Spain.

In 2002, Zograf's work was exhibited at Cartoon Art Museum, titled "Dreamtime/Wartime". A year later, he also wrote an 8-page story titled "How I met America" for New York's Whitney Museum exhibition "American Effect" catalog.

Since 2003, Zograf has published a weekly two-page comic in the Serbian news weekly magazine, VREME.

In 2017, Zograf signed the Declaration on the Common Language of the Croats, Serbs, Bosniaks and Montenegrins.

Zograf appeared as a researcher and the main narrator in the film ‘The Final Adventure of Kaktus Kid’, released in 2018 and directed by Djordje Markovic.

Bibliography 
 Life Under Sanctions (Fantagraphics, 1994)
 Psychonaut (#1-2 published by Fantagraphics, 1996; #3 by Monster Pants Comics/Freight Films, 1999)
 Flock of Dreamers (Kitchen Sink Press, 1997)
 Bulletins from Serbia: E-Mails & Cartoon Strips From Beyond the Front Line (Slab-O-Concrete, 1999)  — translated into several languages.
 Dream Watcher (Slab-O-Concrete, 1999) 
 Jamming with Zograf (self-published, 2002) — collaborations with other cartoonists, including Jim Woodring and Robert Crumb.
 Regards from Serbia (Top Shelf Productions, 2007)

References

External links 
 www.aleksandarzograf.com, official site
An Interview at The High Hat, (2004) https://thehighhat.com/Marginalia/008/lanier_zograf.html 
The Comics Reporter's Short Interview With Aleksandar Zograf (2007) https://www.comicsreporter.com/index.php/resources/interviews/7202/
Regards from Pancevo: an interview with Aleksandar Zograf conducted by Nina Bunjevac (2012) http://bturn.com/6987/regards-from-pancevo-an-interview-with-aleksandar-zograf
“I Am a Quiet Man, Busy with My Thoughts” – Artist Aleksandar Zograf on Serbian Comics, Flea Markets and Why the Graphic Novel is Not His Medium of Choice (2020) https://www.brokenfrontier.com/aleksandar-zograf-serbian-comics-kaktus-kid/
An interview with Zograf regarding ‘The Final Adventure of Kaktus Kid’ and his book ‘Partisanenpost’ published by Bahoe Books of Vienna (2020) https://www.youtube.com/watch?v=ITE-CRAmI0s
Trailer for ‘The Final Adventure of Kaktus Kid’:  https://www.youtube.com/watch?v=N-1UmNE2S7U&t=133s

Alternative cartoonists
Living people
Serbian comics artists
Serbian comics writers
Comics critics
Comic book publishers (people)
1963 births
People from Pančevo
Signatories of the Declaration on the Common Language